The CGR Class H1 was a  steam locomotive of the Garratt type built by Beyer, Peacock & Company, England for the Ceylon Government Railway (CGR), now Sri Lanka Railways. Only one locomotive of this type was built, and its CGR plate number was 293.

Description
This locomotive entered service with the CGR in 1931. It was originally used for working passenger and freight services on the narrow gauge (2 ft 6in)  Uda Pussellawa Railway (UPR) between Nanu Oya and Ragala, via Nuwara Eliya. No. 293 met with a serious accident near Nuwara Eliya in 1942 while hauling a freight train at excessive speed. It was returned to service in 1944 following repairs. Until the 1960s, H1 no. 293 was occasionally used on the Kelani Valley narrow gauge line. Withdrawn from service in 1972, it was scrapped in 1981.

See also
 Locomotives of Sri Lanka Railways
 CGR class C1 and C1a

References

2 ft 6 in gauge locomotives
H1
Garratt locomotives
2-4-0+0-4-2 locomotives
Beyer, Peacock locomotives
Railway locomotives introduced in 1930